The 2019 Oceania Rugby Under 20s, was the fifth edition of the Oceania Rugby Junior Championship.  returned to the Championship tournament for the first time since 2015, replacing  from the previous year and joining  , , and hosts  for the three-round tournament at Bond University on the Gold Coast.

The Oceania Championship was played over three rounds in nine days, with Australia defeating New Zealand by 24–0 in the last match of the round-robin tournament to take the title for the first time.

Teams
The teams for the 2019 Oceania Rugby Under 20 tournament were:

Championship

Standings
{| class="wikitable" style="width:80%; text-align:center"
|-
! colspan="12" | 2019 Oceania Rugby Under 20 Championship
|- 
! style="width:12.5em;" | Team
! style="width:1.5em;" | 
! style="width:1.5em;" | 
! style="width:1.5em;" | 
! style="width:1.5em;" | 
! style="width:2.0em;" | 
! style="width:2.0em;" |  
! style="width:2.0em;" | 
! style="width:1.5em;" | 
! style="width:1.5em;" | 
! style="width:1.5em;" | 

|- bgcolor=#cfc
|align=left|
| 3|| 3|| 0|| 0||104|| 14|| +90||  1||  0||13
|-
|align=left|
| 3|| 2|| 0|| 1||140|| 43|| +97||  2||  0||10 
|-
|align=left|
| 3|| 1|| 0|| 2|| 66||106|| –40||  1||  0||5
|-
|align=left|
| 3|| 0|| 0|| 3|| 63||210||–147||  1||  0||1
|-
|colspan="15" style="vertical-align:bottom; font-size:85%;"|Updated: 4 May 2019
Source: World Rugby 
|}
{| class="wikitable collapsible collapsed" style="text-align:center; line-height:100%; font-size:100%; width:50%;"
|-
! colspan="4" style="border:0px" |Competition rules
|-
| colspan="4" | Points breakdown:4 points for a win2 points for a draw1 bonus point for a loss by seven points or less 1 bonus point for scoring four or more tries in a matchClassification:Teams standings are calculated as follows:Most log points accumulated from all matchesMost log points accumulated in matches between tied teamsHighest difference between points scored for and against accumulated from all matchesMost points scored accumulated from all matches
|}

Round 1

Round 2

Round 3

Trophy
Due to a change in scheduling there was no Oceania Under 20 Trophy contested in 2019. In previous seasons the competition was held during December in the year before the World Rugby Under 20 Trophy. In 2019, however, Oceania Rugby moved these qualification matches to be played in the same year as the 2020 World Rugby Under 20 Trophy.

See also
2019 World Rugby Under 20 Championship
2019 World Rugby Under 20 Trophy

References

External links
Oceania Rugby website 

Oceania Under 20 Rugby Championship
Rugby union competitions in Queensland
Sport on the Gold Coast, Queensland
Oceania Under 20
Oceania Under 20 Rugby Championship
Oceania Under 20 Rugby Championship
Oceania Under 20 Rugby Championship
Oceania Under 20 Rugby Championship
Oceania Under 20 Rugby Championship
Oceania Rugby Under 20 Championship
Oceania Rugby Under 20 Championship